Auto-da-Fé is a one-act 1941 play by Tennessee Williams. The plot concerns a young postal worker, Eloi, whose sexuality is repressed by a rigidly moralistic mother.

References

1941 plays
Plays by Tennessee Williams